Gildo Insfrán (born 19 January 1951) is an Argentine Justicialist Party (PJ) politician, who has been Governor of Formosa Province since 1995.

Having been close to former President Carlos Menem, Insfrán later became close to President Néstor Kirchner, who defeated Menem in 2003 and was the leader of the Justicialist Party.

Insfrán has been the target of accusations of corruption and embezzlement, and has been severely criticized for his long tenure. He arranged to have Formosa's provincial constitution revised to allow him to be reelected indefinitely, and has thus been described as having "stuck a knife into the provincial Constitution". In August 2012, journalist Jorge Lanata investigated the history of Insfrán's governorship and aired an exposé on his television program in which he depicted the province as a feudal fiefdom that is rife with corruption.

Early life and education
Insfrán studies at the National University of the Northeast, where he earned a degree in veterinary science.

Early career
He was elected to the Provincial Legislature in 1983, and in 1987, he became Vice Governor of Formosa under Governor Vicente Joga, serving for two terms.

Governor
Insfrán replaced Joga as Governor of Formosa in 1995, with former governor Floro Bogado serving as his vice-governor.

In order to be re-elected in 1999, Insfrán called a Constitutional Convention at which the provincial constitution, which had imposed term limits, was altered to permit re-election for an indefinite number of terms. Joga with whom he had fallen out, unsuccessfully appealed the changes before the Supreme Court of Argentina.

Insfrán was re-elected in 1999, 2003, 2007, 2011, 2015 and 2019.

Boudougate

On March 30, 2015, Carlos Rívolo, federal prosecutor in the Ciccone Case, also known as Boudougate, asked Judge Sebastian Casanello to investigate the participation of Insfrán as well as various other persons, including Vice President Amado Boudou, in a maneuver related to the restructuring of the public debt of the province of Formosa with the help of a shell company called The Old Fund.

Allegations of corruption
Insfrán has been called head of a "mafia clan." A 2014 article was headlined: "Who is Gildo Insfrán? - biography of a corrupt man" stated: "Since the return of democracy, only one man in the entire country has managed to stay at the highest pinnacle of power: Gildo Insfrán." During his years in power, many of his associates have risen from poverty to great wealth, according to charges made by one lawyer, Juan Eduardo Davis. "Corruption is manifested in the executive branch, in the municipalities, in the police. It is rare to find [government employees in the province] who have not used their positions to enrich themselves."

The province of Formosa under Insfrán has been described as a feudal state in which "his men" run every municipality; it has been compared to the province of Tucumán under José Alperovich. In this poorest province in Argentina, according to one source, those who have grown rich through government connections "shamelessly flaunt their wealth." The investigative reporter Jorge Lanata traveled to Pozo del Tigre, Formosa, in 2014 and reported that "those who do not support the mayor of the town have no access to water."

In April 2011, national deputy Adrián Pérez visited Formosa and said that in the province there was no separation of powers, no administrative transparency, no citizen control, no independent judiciary, no press freedom, and massive corruption. Instead of being treated like citizens with rights and obligations, he said, people in Formosa are part of a "scheme of submission" whereby the government politically and financially exploits poverty.

"The intimate relationship of justice to political power is shameless," said Juan Eduardo Davis. In the province, "neither the largest newspapers nor the television report serious events" that reflect negatively on the government because they are dependent on government advertising.

A 2012 report stated that infant mortality in the province was 18 per thousand, that 20% of households had no refrigerators, 16% cooked with firewood or charcoal, and 74% had no computer. Merit Antonio Ferreyra, Insfrán's chief of staff, "owns the entire state and private health system," including all of the ambulances in the province. The infant mortality rate in Formosa is the highest in Argentina. Two-thirds of the employed individuals in Formosa work for the state. Forty-one percent of households have no running water; 31% lack electricity.

Drug trafficking
Insfrán has been accused of turning the province of Formosa into "a privileged sanctuary for drug traffickers" bringing cocaine into Argentina. The province has the highest density of narcotics per square meter in Argentina. Under his authority, the province has allegedly experienced a "total lack of control on drug trafficking," which, according to Davis, has been a major source of revenue for the province. Police and security forces have been accused of colluding with traffickers by guarding airstrips at which planes carrying drugs have landed and been unloaded. Hugo Palma, a politician in Estanislao del Campo, Formosa, had an airstrip on his property where 700 kilos of cocaine were seized from drug traffickers.

Treatment of indigenous people
Among indigenous people in Argentina, Formosa is seen as place of "repression and constant harassment." An Amnesty International report on the indigenous people of Formosa outlined "the systematic violation of human rights, the dispossession of ancestral lands, structural poverty and political-state apparatus that marginalizes and coerces indigenous peoples." The general perception is reportedly that under Insfrán's authority, the life or death of an indigenous person is not equivalent to the life or death of a white person.

Kirchner connection
Once a Menem supporter, Insfrán became a "K" politician early on; he was "the first governor to support Néstor Kirchner." As a Kirchnerist, as one source put it, "he has institutionalized due obedience." It has been said that "Kirchner is Insfrán, Insfrán is Kirchner." "Behind the progressive discourse," national deputy Adrián Pérez has said, "Kirchner exercises his royal power" through such "authoritarian and conservative" figures as Insfrán. President Cristina Fernández, like her husband before her, is close to Insfrán and has showered him with "lavish government funds."

Insfrán, for his part, named a major street in the city of Formosa Avenida Doctor Néstor Carlos Kirchner.

Personal life
Insfrán has two daughters with Teresa Baldus, Sofia and Gianninna. The couple also had a son, Gildo Miguel Insfrán, who committed suicide on August 5, 2003, at the age of seventeen. He shot himself in the right temple with a 9mm pistol. The motive for the suicide has never been publicly clarified.

References

External links
  'Insfrán marchaba hacia la victoria en Formosa', Río Negro, 2003-10-20
  Formosa Province

1951 births
Living people
People from Formosa Province
Argentine people of French descent
National University of the Northeast alumni
Male veterinarians
Justicialist Party politicians
Governors of Formosa Province
Members of the Chamber of Deputies of Formosa
Argentine veterinarians